Tiquie Airport  is an airport serving Tiquié, a village in the Vaupés Department of Colombia. The runway is inside the village, which is on the upper reaches of the Tiquié River (sv).

See also

Transport in Colombia
List of airports in Colombia

References

External links 
GCMnet - Tiquie Airport
FallingRain - Tiquie Airport

Airports in Colombia
Vaupés Department